Jan Vanlangendonck (born 10 January 1960) is a Belgian former professional tennis player.

Born in Heist-op-den-Berg, Vanlangendonck was a right-handed player and played on the professional tour in the 1980s. He reached a best singles ranking of 191 in the world and featured in the men's doubles main draw of the 1982 French Open.

Vanlangendonck appeared in 10 Davis Cup ties for Belgium between 1983 and 1987.

His daughter, Eliessa Vanlangendonck, plays on the WTA Tour.

Challenger titles

Doubles: (1)

See also
List of Belgium Davis Cup team representatives

References

External links
 
 
 

1960 births
Living people
Belgian male tennis players
People from Heist-op-den-Berg
Sportspeople from Antwerp Province